Naale Elite Academy is an international program jointly funded by the Israeli Ministry of Education and the Jewish Agency. It enables Jewish teenagers from the diaspora to study and complete their high school education in Israel for free. 

The program brings Jewish teenagers worldwide to study for three or four years in a number of designated Israeli high schools which enroll regular students from the surrounding area, but also have Naale dormitories on their premises or within a walking distance (the latter usually in a moshav) and which employ specialized Hebrew language teachers to handle Naale program students.

With de facto 90% of graduates staying to reside permanently in Israel and 20000 students since the program inception as of 2022, Naale is a substantial source of (vetted) adolescent immigrants with the graduates joining the IDF, studying in Israeli universities or entering the Israeli workforce.

History

The program was founded in 1992 in a joint effort with the Jewish Agency.

According to the Naale program director Yeshayahu Yechieli the idea of bringing Jewish children without parents to Israel to get education at no cost to their parents and without having to commit to making Aliyah was proposed in early 90s by then Israeli Prime Minister Yitzhak Shamir. 

Yeshayahu Yechieli, who was already involved in a program that brought Russian Jewish youth to Israel for a young leadership program heard about the idea and got in touch with the Israeli Ministry of Education and they were supportive. 

His perception was that "the education system in the FSU had deteriorated drastically and parents needed to find other options" and "according to family and friends living in Israel, the standard of education in the country was very high".

The program was run in pilot mode until 2000, after which it was expanded to other countries and took on its current form.

The program course

Application
Potential candidates must be eligible according to Israel's Law of Return and must undergo a registration and testing process before being accepted to the program.

A student can apply in the eighth, ninth or 10th grade (starting study age bracket between 13 years 9 months and 16 years 10 months ). Potential students and at least one parent then attend a special screening day that entails academic and psychological examinations to ensure that students are suited for the program. The only (non-refundable) fees are a registration fee (before the screening) and an acceptance fee (if accepted into the program), costing $600 each. There are no fees for applicants from the Post-Soviet states.

Academic achievements are not a pivotal requirement, the main acceptance criteria is "social skills and maturity level".

Academic tracks
There are two academic tracks available - regular (choice of a secular or religious school, 3 or 4 years) and advanced (the Anieres program - secular, 4 years).

Regular academic track
Available for almost every eligible Naale applicant who passed the entrance psychological examination. After the first year during which the students master basic Hebrew there is a math exam and depending on its results the students are subdivided into sections which will study 3 (the lowest level), 4 or 5 point math. The 4 or 5 point level math is frequently a requirement to enter an Israeli university.

Anieres program

The Anieres program is part of Naale, the school is located in Nahalal. There is an additional "quantitative thinking" written entrance exam the candidates take, if they fail they can still go to a regular school. 

On the top of the Naale program it claims to include "a free university degree in science or engineering"  subject to certain conditions, namely, if Anieres students achieve sufficient Bagrut and psychometry scores for the chosen field in science or engineering, in addition to the army Atuda program which is also available for the rest of the Naale schools it has the second option of "full military service followed by studies at the Technion, subject to compliance with the admission requirements".

Since the Anieres program is geared towards an academic degree its students don't have the lowest 3 point level math as an option.

During the study years
Each student enrolled into the program receives a scholarship funded by the Israeli Ministry of Education.
The scholarship includes the first flight to Israel upon admittance into the program, full tuition, health insurance, pocket money, room and board and other necessities.

Since the students are minors, they stay most of the time on the boarding school premises. To venture outside both permission of the student's Naale instructor and parental approval are required. Some students are matched to volunteer host families with whom they can spend an "open" Shabbat.

There are rules prohibiting alcohol, drugs, and any forms of violence. Such are the regulations of the Israeli Ministry of Education, and they are implemented by the administration of Naale in coordination with each boarding school.

As with every boarding school arrangement not all disciplinary aspects which are claimed to be enforced can be controlled in practice especially for higher grades, for example smoking is not an actual ground for the dismissal from the program. While there is zero tolerance as to drugs, alcohol consumption occasionally may happen.

After graduation
At the end of the program, graduates can choose to stay in Israel and make Aliyah or choose to return abroad except for Israeli citizens (e.g. those ascribed automatic citizenship in accordance with Israeli citizenship law) who must serve in the army after the graduation. 

If the graduates get sufficient IDF screening score they may have an option (at the army discretion and with the choice of academic tracks tailored to each candidate) to be accepted to the Atuda program and complete a college or university degree partially paid by the army in exchange for signing a contract to serve in the army two or three additional years after completing two years and eight months of obligatory service (female soldiers also sign to extend their obligatory service to the same length as their male counterparts ).

Students who choose to make Aliyah are eligible for an absorption basket from the Ministry of Aliyah and Integration, though they will have received some of their rights as a Naale student. They are also eligible for subsidized undergraduate tuition in Israeli universities upon completion of their army service subject to certain conditions.

Management structure

Students are divided into groups of 20 to 25, each group occupies a separate dormitory area.

Every group of students is managed by two to three counselors who care for the basic
needs of the adolescents (e.g., food, cleaning, etc.), supervise their schoolwork, and organize various social activities. 

The counselors are not required to have a formal experience in education or any tertiary degree (e.g. they may take the job after having completed the military service and some of the counselors are Naale graduates themselves), but they usually have some experience in informal education and are motivated to help the immigrant adolescents.

A team of psychologists and social workers supervises the immediate group staff and, when deemed necessary, the students may be referred to the team for psychological evaluation and intervention.

There is the school director (the director of the youth village) who has several deputies.

Majority of issues related to individual students are solved by the counselors, some questions reach the deputies, the Naale school director is engaged e.g. in the case of critical disciplinary events like students leaving the campus without permission to attend a party.

There is one school nurse per school who coordinates with the nearby health insurer clinic family doctor.

Separately there are regional managers who are responsible for marketing, recruiting students and organizing the application process.

Psychological well-being of Naale students

The essence of the Naale program is about immigration, so its main purpose is to provide smooth transition to a new life in a new country.

The Naale students, while enrolled in the program, seem to have a lower level of psychological distress comparing to their peers who immigrated with their parents and are living in the community.

Being physically separated from their parents, they spend all their time within the peer group which, along with the administration staff,  becomes their surrogate family and, essentially, the only source of support. 

They are insulated from the most of the stresses which their peers, who immigrated with their parents and living in the community are exposed to. They don't suffer from the adjustment difficulties of their parents. During the first year they intensively study Hebrew and attend classes in a language they understand instead of attending the regular high school from the outset, so their transition as to learning is more gradual.

Some students benefit from the surrogate relationship reaching the maturity level which they couldn't achieve if living with their parents, while for other students the physical separation from their families may impair their emotional individuation process causing psychological problems in later life.

Controversy
A regional director for Naale plainly stated: "The downside of this project is that parents and kids are separated, which is hard because it is a young age".

As the program manages all aspects of the students' life even providing surrogate parental figures (the administration staff, host families etc.) - the role of the parents in the complex immigration transition process is not obvious.  "Prolonged separation from the family due to placement at boarding schools has been noted as a risk factor for permanently disrupting the bond between the child and the parent". It may also "result in emotional, intellectual, and mental alienation toward their parents and their family that is not always possible to bridge" and "impair the separation/individuation process from their parents" which is of "utmost importance". 

It follows, despite the parent confidence in the constancy of the parent-child relationship, that at the very least the bond between the parents and the child, whom they decided to send to the free program - so in a sense willingly outsourcing their further parental responsibility, may gradually weaken because of the parental role substitution, even if the result is perceived by their child as positive. It is also possible, although less likely when the student came from a functional family, that the physical separation from the parents may disrupt the identity formation and therefore negatively affect the child's adult life.

While the program received attention of psychology researchers such as Prof. Julia Mirsky, there is no publicly available specific statistics and there is no any kind of formal research on the Naale graduates after they finished the program.

It also appears there are no regular alumni events per batch or in general, which may have something to do with the observation that the retreat into the safety of a peer-group of fellow immigrants is a natural, but only temporary stage of coping with the stresses of migration.

Naale vs other immigration choices

Statistics

Since the program’s establishment in 1992, as of 2018, over 17,000 teenagers had passed through the program with about 85% staying in Israel  (over 90% as of 2019 ) and 40% of the parents making Aliyah as well  and, also as of 2018, there were over 2,000 students studying in Naale Elite Academy schools.

It follows, that about half of the graduates will make Aliyah while their families will keep living abroad and if the family doesn't make Aliyah there is 75%-85% chance that their child, after leaving for Naale as a minor, will effectively leave home and will settle in Israel after the graduation. 

Roughly two-thirds of the students are from the Former Soviet Union and a third are from the rest of the world  with students arriving from the United States, South America, France, Germany, Italy, South Africa, Australia, Japan, the Philippines and many other countries.

Naale and Russia-Ukraine war

Since the 2022 Russian invasion of Ukraine 350 students from Ukraine were brought to Israel and placed in Naale schools by 2023.

Those Ukrainian refugees who applied for an entry permit to Israel under the Law of Return received it swiftly without further background checks if at least one of their children has taken part in the Naale program.

Naale Elite Academy Schools and Boarding Schools 

Naale Elite Academy schools are located around Israel and cater to both religious and secular students. Students are offered their choice of school based on religious preference, their country of origin and their academic level.

Na'ale groups over the years

Below is the list of the Naale Elite Academy groups by year:

Notable alumni

References

External links
 English official website
Hebrew official website
German official website
French official website
Spanish official website
Portuguese official website
Russian official website
Naale Elite Academy Alumni
Naale Elite Academy Facebook
Naale Elite Academy Instagram
Naale Elite Academy Youtube

Aliyah
Education in Israel
Jewish Agency for Israel
1992 establishments in Israel
Jewish education in Israel
Boarding schools in Israel
Youth villages in Israel